Doctors is a British medical soap opera which began broadcasting on BBC One on 26 March 2000. Set in the fictional West Midlands town of Letherbridge, the soap follows the lives of the staff and patients of the Riverside Health Centre and the Best Practice, two fictional NHS doctor's surgeries. The following is a list of characters that first appeared in Doctors in 2003 and 2004, by order of first appearance. All characters are introduced by the programme's executive producer, Mal Young. January 2003 saw the introduction of George Woodson (Stirling Gallacher) and her husband Ronnie (Seán Gleeson), as well as Julia Parsons (Diane Keen). In April 2003, Ben Jones joined the cast as Greg Robinson. He was followed by Akemnji Ndifornyen, who joined in February 2004 as Nathan Bailey, the estranged son of Ben Kwarme (Ariyon Bakare). Andrea Green then joined as receptionist Sarah Finch in May 2004. Tasha Verma (Shabana Bakhsh) began appearing in October 2004. Additionally, multiple other characters appeared throughout the year.

George Woodson

Dr. George Woodson, portrayed by Stirling Gallacher, first appeared on 7 January 2003 and made her final appearance on 27 March 2009. Shortly after her introduction, the soap introduced her husband, lawyer Ronnie Woodson (Seán Gleeson). The same year as her casting on Doctors, Gallacher fell pregnant, but writers chose not to write her pregnancy into the soap as they felt that the Woodsons were not ready to have a child. Three years later, the couple have a daughter, Bracken (Jessica Gallagher). George gets post-natal depression and believes that Ronnie is a better parent, returning to work early. However, when Bracken falls ill, George rushes to be with her. Gallacher announced her decision to leave Doctors in 2009 to pursue other roles, with George leaving alongside her on-screen family.

Gallacher and Gleeson won the award for Best On-Screen Partnership at the 2007 British Soap Awards. The following year, their character's car crash and the following aftermath was nominated for Spectacular Scene of the Year, as well as Best Storyline. Gallacher also received a nomination for Best Actress.

Julia Parsons

Julia Parsons (also McGuire), portrayed by Diane Keen, first appeared on 13 January 2003 and made her initial final appearance on 18 May 2012. Keen reprised her role for three episodes in March 2020 as part of Doctors 20th anniversary celebrations. Julia was introduced to Riverside Health Centre as a receptionist working alongside ex-husband Mac McGuire (Christopher Timothy). The pair reconcile their relationship and eventually get married, which Julia ends when she finds him kissing his ex-wife Kate McGuire (Maggie Cronin). She forces the pair to leave and takes over the surgery, now renamed the Mill Health Centre. Julia eventually leaves Letherbridge with Martin Millar (Miles Anderson).

For her portrayal of Julia, Keen was annually nominated for the British Soap Award for Best Actress between the 2005 and 2010 British Soap Awards. She was nominated for Best Actress again in 2012. Julia's car crash was also nominated for the Spectacular Scene of the Year award at 2013 ceremony. Keen won in the Actress category at the 2008 RTS Midlands Awards. The character was also selected as one of the "top 100 British soap characters" by industry experts for a poll ran by What's on TV, with readers able to vote for their favourite character to discover "Who is Soap's greatest Legend?"

Ronnie Woodson

Ronnie Woodson, portrayed by Seán Gleeson, first appeared on 17 January 2003 and made his final appearance on 27 March 2009. Ronnie was introduced shortly after the soap had introduced his wife, George (Stirling Gallacher). An experienced lawyer, Ronnie is often seen working with his clients and is "the first person anyone turns to", but is as committed to his family as he is to his job. On his BBC Online profile, Ronnie was described as "very laid back and a little naïve". It noted that although he enjoys his job, he is always trying to get in on bigger cases by "keeping his ear to the ground" at local police stations since he sees himself as a big criminal lawyer.

Although Ronnie is initially against the idea of having children, he settles into fatherhood when George has their daughter, Bracken (Jessica Gallagher). In 2009, it was announced that Gleeson had made the decision to leave Doctors, as well as Gallacher. Their exits aired together, as well as that of their on-screen daughter's. Peter Lloyd, the series producer on Doctors, was saddened by the Woodson's exit since he was "sad to see such vivid characters go". After Ronnie is offered and accepts a job in Shanghai, he, George and Bracken move to China.

For his portrayal of Ronnie, Gleeson was nominated for the British Soap Award for Best Actor in 2007, as well as the award for Sexiest Male. At the same ceremony, himself and Gallacher won the award for Best On-Screen Partnership. In 2008, he received another nomination for Best Actor.

Greg Robinson
Dr. Greg Robinson, portrayed by Ben Jones, first appeared on 30 April 2003 and made his final appearance on 13 April 2007. Greg was introduced as a gay doctor at the Riverside Health Centre. On Ben's BBC Online profile, he was described as "a charming, energetic personality" who never stops making jokes. Greg meets Rico Da Silva (Felix D'Alviella), a travel writer, in Goa and the pair have a fling. Rico then unexpectedly arrives in Letherbridge and the pair continue their relationship, eventually getting married. Their wedding was the first same sex wedding on British television. His father is uncomfortable with Greg's sexuality and their wedding, but his mother is "always supportive" of him.

Greg is shocked and devastated to learn that Rico has fathered a child as a favour to his friend, Jess Butler (Matilda Ziegler). His child, Charlie (Shane Burke), eventually leaves to live with his mother in Denmark, which leaves Greg happy. However, Rico admits that he wants to leave to be with his son and Greg ends their marriage. Greg eventually realises that he has made a mistake and leaves Letherbridge to be with Rico.

Nathan Bailey

Nathan Bailey, portrayed by Akemnji Ndifornyen, first appeared on 16 February 2004 and made his final appearance on 13 June 2005. Ben was introduced as a receptionist at the Riverside Health Centre, as well as the estranged son of Ben Kwarme (Ariyon Bakare). He initially hides his identity, wanting to get to know Ben first, but after he reveals himself as Ben's son, the pair form a "a difficult and tempestuous relationship" which evolves to be a close relationship. Nathan's backstory involves being adopted as a child and being brought up by a couple who owned a pub. After finishing his A-Levels, Nathan decided to trace his real parents, which led him to Ben.

On his BBC Online profile, Nathan was described as "always polite" and it noted his charm with the patients and the ladies of Riverside. During his tenure, he had a one-night stand with Sarah Finch (Andrea Green) and then begins a relationship with her friend, Tasha Verma (Shabana Bakhsh), who he gets pregnant. Their relationship, which was already suffering prior to her pregnancy, ends and he is relived when Tasha decides to have their baby adopted. However, Ben makes him face up to his responsibilities and offer to support Tasha. After Nathan and Ben are critically injured in an explosion at Riverside, they leave Letherbridge to go travelling together.

Sarah Finch

Sarah Finch, portrayed by Andrea Green, first appeared on 10 May 2004 and made her final appearance on 13 April 2006. She was introduced as a receptionist at the Best Practice. On her first day, she impresses Best partner Marc Eliot (Tom Butcher) by helping to fix his car. Her BBC Online profile described Sarah as bright, but noted that she never applied herself at school which led to a lack of qualifications. It also described her as "bubbly and full of life", stating how "she would never shut up and her mouth often got her into trouble". Sarah becomes close friends with Nathan Bailey (Akemnji Ndifornyen), but she forms romantic feelings for him. After the pair have sex, she realises that he wants nothing serious and keeps her romantic feelings a secret, even when he becomes involved with her colleague, Tasha Verma (Shabana Bakhsh).

Sarah and other colleague Jimmi Clay (Adrian Lewis Morgan) form a flirtatious relationship but never become more than friends. Sarah helps Jimmi through a divorce and with his debt problems. He tries to ask Sarah out on several occasions, but she turns since she feels he is immature. Jimmi proposes to Sarah at Greg Robinson's (Ben Jones) wedding, but she declines, knowing that he is merely seeking to replace his ex-wife, Amanda. She then leaves to work in Brazil with Rico Da Silva's (Felix D'Alviella) sister.

For her role as Sarah, Green won the British Soap Award for Best Newcomer in 2005. At the same ceremony, she was nominated for Sexiest Female. She was nominated for Sexiest Female again in 2006.

Tasha Verma

Tasha Verma, portrayed by Shabana Bakhsh, first appeared on 5 October 2004 and made her final appearance on 18 April 2005. Bakhsh secured the role after being axed from the BBC Scotland soap opera River City. On her BBC Online profile, Tasha was described as "a bit square" who was often misunderstood. It also noted her "dry sense of humour and great smile". Tasha has a brief relationship with Nathan Bailey (Akemnji Ndifornyen). However, just before she plans to their relationship, she discovers that she is pregnant with his baby. She informs Nathan that she does not expect support from him and plans to have the baby adopted; Nathan attempts to convince her to reconsider but she stays firm.

In an episode broadcast in March 2005, a masked intruder sets fire to gas cylinders in the reception area of the Riverside Health Centre, setting off a massive explosion. Tasha is knocked unconscious and gets trapped inside. She discovers afterwards that she has lost her baby, and wracked with guilt, she leaves Letherbridge to move back in with her parents.

Other characters

References

Doctors
Doctors
2003
, Doctors
, Doctors